Orectochilus discifer, sometimes Patrus discifer, is a species of whirligig beetle found in India, Sri Lanka.

The average size is about 7.1 mm.

It is identified as a host of ectoparasitic fungi called Laboulbenia strangulata.

References 

Gyrinidae
Insects of Sri Lanka
Insects described in 1859